Joel Kellman (born 25 May 1994) is a Swedish professional ice hockey center for the Växjö Lakers of the Swedish Hockey League (SHL).

Playing career
Undrafted, Kellman played as a junior within the Malmö Redhawks before making his Swedish Hockey League debut playing 1 game with HV71 during the 2013–14 SHL season.

Kellman transferred to Karlskrona HK of the HockeyAllsvenskan, after an initial loan, for the 2014–15 season. In helping Karlskrona gain promotion to the SHL, Kellman became a fixture amongst the scoring lines in the following three seasons. Improving his points totals in each season, Kellman produced 15 goals and 34 points in 51 games during the 2017–18 season, however was unable to prevent Karlskrona returning to the Allsvenskan.

In order to remain in the SHL, Kellman signed a two-year contract with Brynäs IF on 9 April 2018. In the 2018–19 season with Brynäs IF, he tallied 16 goals and 18 assists in 45 games. He led the team in goals and was third in assists and points.

In showing continued improvement throughout his SHL career, Kellman opted out of his contract with Brynäs in securing a one-year, entry-level contract with the San Jose Sharks of the NHL on 26 April 2019. He made his NHL debut on 21 December 2019. He scored his first NHL goal on 28 December 2019, in a 6–1 win over the Philadelphia Flyers.

On 28 August 2020, Kellman as a restricted free agent was signed to a two-year $1.5 million contract extension with the San Jose Sharks. On 18 September 2020, Kellman was loaned to Swedish Allsvenskan club, Kristianstads IK, until the commencement of the delayed 2020–21 NHL season. He featured in 14 games with Kristianstads, collecting 3 goals and 5 points. In December 2021, his contract with the Sharks was terminated and he signed with the Växjö Lakers.

Career statistics

Regular season and playoffs

International

References

External links

1994 births
Living people
Borås HC players
Brynäs IF players
Swedish expatriate ice hockey players in the United States
HV71 players
Karlskrona HK players
Kristianstads IK players
People from Karlskrona
Malmö Redhawks players
San Jose Barracuda players
San Jose Sharks players
Swedish ice hockey centres
Undrafted National Hockey League players
Växjö Lakers players
Sportspeople from Blekinge County